Kelly Michelle Lee Osbourne (born 27 October 1984) is an English television personality, singer, actress, model, and fashion designer. The daughter of Ozzy and Sharon Osbourne, she appeared on the reality television show The Osbournes (2002–2005) with her family, for which they won a 2002 Emmy Award for Outstanding Reality Program. In 2009, she appeared on Dancing with the Stars, in which she and her professional dance partner Louis van Amstel took third place. Osbourne was a presenter on Project Catwalk (2007–2008) and Fashion Police (2010–2015) and a judge on Project Runway Junior (2015–present) and Australia's Got Talent (2016). She also played the voice role of Hildy Gloom in the Disney XD animated series The 7D (2014–2016).

As a singer, Osbourne has released two studio albums: Shut Up (2002) and Sleeping in the Nothing (2005). In 2003, she collaborated with her father Ozzy on the single "Changes" (a Black Sabbath song) which reached number one on the UK Singles Chart.

Early life
Osbourne was born in Westminster, London. She has an elder sister, Aimee, and a younger brother, Jack. From Ozzy's first marriage, she also has two half-siblings: Jessica Hobbs and Louis John Osbourne. She had an unofficially "adopted" brother, Robert Marcato, whom Sharon and Ozzy took in after Marcato's mother died. Kelly grew up travelling with her father as he went on tour, and lived in more than 20 homes, mostly in the US, as well as in the UK. Her maternal grandfather was Don Arden (Harry Levy), an English music manager. Her mother is of Irish and Jewish descent.

Osbourne attended private schools in England including Pipers Corner School.

Career

2002–2005: The Osbournes and Shut Up
Osbourne and the rest of her family (without Aimee) starred on the MTV reality show The Osbournes, which aired from 2002 to 2005. The series chronicled their day-to-day life, portraying a dysfunctional family in which metal music, profanity and other harshness were a daily part of life. Kelly, the middle child, emerged (according to Rolling Stone) as "a wickedly funny, brutally honest, pint-size, potty-mouthed spitfire." The series started when she was seventeen, and ended when she was twenty. Kelly said in an interview for The Osbournes DVD that the crew were only actually supposed to be there for a few weeks but ended up staying for a few months and that the constant cameras focusing on her and her family was stressful. In 2002, during the second season of The Osbournes, Kelly dated The Used lead singer Bert McCracken. The show was filmed in California, where the family has had their residence for several decades.

Both she and the Osbourne family were parodied in Channel 4 comedy Bo' Selecta in which the rubber-masked Kelly, played by Leigh Francis, has her own show and is always being censored for swearing with bleeps.

After her appearance on the reality show, Osbourne quickly began to be noted for her varied and trendy style among fashion commentators like Steven Cojocaru. In 2004, Osbourne launched her own fashion line, Stiletto Killers, with her friend and former sponsor, Ali Barone. Stiletto Killers was a rock-inspired line of tees, knickers, hoodies and sweatpants designed by Osbourne and Barone, emblazoned with cartoonish designs and punk rock phrases. There was also a more sophisticated couture branch, the SK Collection. Stiletto Killers closed in April 2006.

Her debut album, Shut Up, was released by Epic Records in 2002 to moderate American sales, but good European sales. The lead single, a cover of Madonna's "Papa Don't Preach", debuted with Houston rock band Pure Rubbish at the 2002 MTV Film Awards. The album, which debuted at No. 1 on Billboards Heatseekers chart, was met with mixed critical reviews and, by May 2003, Osbourne was dropped from Epic Records. By autumn she was on the Sanctuary label, later recording a duet of "Changes" (a Black Sabbath song) with her father. The duet hit No. 1 on the UK charts and resulted in a reissue of Shut Up, titled Changes. "Changes" was one of a few tracks to have fallen down the charts (from 1–3) whilst selling more copies than the week it reached number 1. Osbourne was the first artists to top all three of the Billboard charts dance surveys in the same week with the "Chris Cox Club Remix" of "One Word". Her second album Sleeping in the Nothing was not without controversy, due to its reportedly heavily altered album cover, in which Osbourne appeared slimmer, despite her previous assertions of being happy with her size.

Osbourne made her debut as an actress with a starring role on 7 October 2004 on the ABC high school teenage drama Life as We Know It, where she played the supporting role of Deborah Beatrice Tynan. During an interview in late 2005, Osbourne denied reports she was ending her music career, saying: "I don't know where the quit rumours came from – I've just recorded a version of 'Girls Just Want to Have Fun' with Cyndi Lauper."

On 2 April 2004, Osbourne entered the Malibu rehab facility Promises after admitting to her family that she was addicted to painkillers. Over a year later, on 2 June, she checked into Las Encinas Hospital, a drug treatment centre in Pasadena, California, after a relapse. She entered another drug treatment facility in January 2009; she stayed for a month and later acknowledged that she had a relapse of her addiction to painkillers. After 30 days, she was released; she has been quoted as saying that this was the first time she really thought rehab had helped her.

2006–2009: Acting and hosting duties
In spring 2006, Osbourne modelled for Heatherette in a catwalk show. In June, she played the role of Wendy from Peter Pan in The Queen's Handbag and provided her voice for the animated film Live Freaky Die Freaky. Later that year, she became the face of the high street chain Accessorize. Osbourne co-hosted the 2006 edition of I'm a Celebrity...Get Me Out of Here! NOW!, a spin-off show of the main ITV programme. She hosted alongside Jeff Brazier in Australia, and Mark Durden-Smith in the London studio. Her one-off gigs include the 2002 MTV Film Awards, Top of the Pops Saturday, MTV's Isle of MTV, MTV UK and Ireland's red carpet coverage of the 2003 MTV Europe Music Awards, Popworld, The Sunday Night Project, the 2005 MTV Australia Video Music Awards and Zane Lowe's BBC Radio 1 show. In spring 2006, Osbourne was one of the judges on Making Your Mind Up. At the September 2006 Electric Picnic festival in Ireland, Osbourne and her boyfriend, Matty Derham of the band Fields, held a wedding ceremony. Her representative later denied that the ceremony was legally binding because it did not meet Irish legal requirements, as at that time in Ireland, a couple couldn't get married in an outdoor venue. She later went on to date Matt Walker, a promoter and tour manager.

In February 2006, Osbourne was a guest judge for the Season One Episode Four of Project Catwalk on Sky1. She went on to host Seasons Two and Three of Project Catwalk in 2007 and 2008 respectively. In July 2007, Osbourne portrayed the role of prison matron Mama Morton in the musical drama Chicago for seven weeks at the Cambridge Theatre. In autumn 2007, Osbourne signed to BBC Radio 1 to host the Sunday night show, The Surgery; and on 7 October 2007, she went on air for the first time with the issue of self-harm. She was scheduled to return to the show in early 2009 and whilst she was away, Aled Haydn Jones from The Chris Moyles Show presented the show. Aled subsequently became the full-time presenter. In 2008, she featured in the short musical film The Town that Boars Me by photographer Ben Charles Edwards. The film also features Sadie Frost, Jodie Harsh, Sophie Ellis-Bextor, and Zandra Rhodes, amongst others. The film debuted in late summer at the Portobello Film Festival. In 2009, she appeared in an episode of Hotel Babylon, a British TV show aired on BBC One. She played Jo, a character very similar to herself.

On 19 January 2009, Osbourne was arrested for assault after allegedly slapping Daily Mirror columnist Zoe Griffin at a club in August 2008 after Griffin wrote a story that mocked Osbourne's then-boyfriend, Luke Worrall. In March 2009, Osbourne and Worrall were engaged, but later separated in July 2010 after he had an affair with model Elle Schneider. Osbourne presented ITV2's coverage of the National Television Awards with her brother Jack, and a documentary on Japanese pop culture called Kelly Osbourne: Turning Japanese for the same channel. In March 2009, Osbourne returned to television with the rest of the Osbourne family on Osbournes: Reloaded. On 1 September 2009, Osbourne released her first autobiography, Fierce, via Virgin Books. The book contains autobiographical elements, as well as advice and guidance through tough periods.

In September 2009, she started writing a weekly column giving advice and celebrity gossip in UK magazine Closer.

2009: Dancing with the Stars
On 17 August 2009, co-hosts Tom Bergeron and Samantha Harris announced the cast of stars for the 2009 autumn series of Dancing with the Stars. Osbourne was to be one of the 16 celebrity contestants. A week later, her professional partner was announced: Dutch ballroom champion Louis van Amstel. The competition, starting 21 September 2009, entailed 10 weeks of training and dancing. On 17 November 2009, the final three were announced: Osbourne, singer Mýa and pop legend Donny Osmond. In the final, Osbourne and her partner placed third.

Performances

2010–present: Fashion Police and other endeavours

In August 2010, Osbourne began filming on the comedy Should've Been Romeo, her first major role in Hollywood. She plays Nicole, a fun-loving groupie. The film was released in the US on 28 April 2012. In December 2010, it was confirmed that Osbourne would be starring alongside Disney star Miley Cyrus in So Undercover, playing a sorority sister of Cyrus'. Filming began in December 2010 and was released on 6 December 2012.

In 2010, she modeled a Chris Benz dress for Naomi Campbell's Fashion For Relief runway show for the White Ribbon Alliance to raise funds for mothers in Haiti. In 2011 Osbourne became a fashion correspondent for the cable network E!, serving as a host, with Joan Rivers, of the series Fashion Police. In June 2011, she hosted the Miss USA pageant at the Planet Hollywood Resort and Casino, Las Vegas, with Susie Castillo.

In 2012, she appeared as a guest judge in season 4 of RuPaul's Drag Race, and hosted the New Now Next Awards. In September 2012, US rapper Lil' Kim confirmed she and Osbourne were to join forces for a rock-rap cover of Elton John's 1974 hit "The Bitch Is Back". In 2013, Osbourne walked the runway for The Heart Truth Red Dress Fashion Show.

On 7 March 2013, while filming an episode of Fashion Police with guest Melissa Rivers, Osbourne collapsed and began experiencing a seizure that reportedly lasted thirty seconds, after which she was taken to a local Los Angeles hospital for testing.

In July 2013, Osbourne became engaged to Matthew Mosshart, a chef whom she met at the 2011 wedding of model Kate Moss to Jamie Hince. Osbourne and Mosshart called off the engagement in January 2014.

In August 2013, Osbourne was a guest judge on the 12th season of Project Runway. She was a guest judge on the October 2014 premiere episode of Project Runway: Threads. She is a regular judge on Project Runway: Junior.

In February 2015, Osbourne exited Fashion Police after complaints about her co-host's comments on the show.

On 28 October 2015, it was confirmed that Osbourne would replace Dawn French as a judge on Australia's Got Talent for its eighth season on Channel Nine.

In 2018, Osbourne joined her father and brother in their televised global tour that is documented in the series Ozzy & Jack's World Detour.

On 13 November 2019, Osbourne competed in season two of The Masked Singer as "Ladybug".

Personal life
In September 2006, Osbourne dated musician Matty Derman of Fields. In 2008, she started dating model Luke Worrall. They were engaged in 2009, but separated in 2010. In 2018, she described herself as suffering from misophonia, a neurobehavioral phenomenon associated with an intolerance of specific sounds or their associated stimuli.

She is currently dating Slipknot DJ Sid Wilson, and they have a son, born in 2022.

Activism and charity work
On 1 April 2010, Osbourne and her mother Sharon joined Cyndi Lauper in the launch of the Give a Damn campaign to bring a wider awareness of discrimination of the LGBT community, as part of Lauper's True Colours Fund. The campaign is designed to bring straight people to stand up with the gay, lesbian, bisexual, transgender community and stop the discrimination. Other names included in the campaign are Whoopi Goldberg, Jason Mraz, Elton John, Judith Light, Cynthia Nixon, Kim Kardashian, Anna Paquin and Clay Aiken.

In December 2010, she appeared on the ITV gameshow The Cube, where she won £20,000 for The Prince's Trust.

In the aftermath of Hurricane Sandy, Osbourne joined hands with the Salvation Army in Staten Island, New York during their recovery efforts in November 2012.

Controversy
On 4 August 2015, while appearing as a guest co-host on The View, Osbourne caused controversy when she said: "If you kick every Latino out of this country, then who is going to be cleaning your toilet, Donald Trump?" Her comments were in response to then-Republican Party presidential candidate Donald Trump's stance on illegal Mexican immigration. Co-host Rosie Perez quickly interjected by stating: "There's more jobs than that in the country for Latinos, and Latinos are not the only people who clean toilets." Osbourne then attempted to explain herself by stating "I didn't mean it like that." Osbourne's comments led to the Twitter hashtag #QueridaKellyOsbourne (Dear Kelly Osbourne). Hours after her appearance on the show, she released a clarification on Facebook. Perez apologised for misconstruing her statement. Her comments came almost six months after her decision to leave Fashion Police, which was allegedly due to a racially insensitive comment made by Giuliana Rancic.

Discography

Albums

Singles

Notes

Filmography

Television

Film

Music videos

Awards and nominations

See also
 List of artists who reached number one on the US dance chart
 List of number-one dance hits (United States)

References

External links

 

 
1984 births
Living people
Actresses from London
British women activists
British women fashion designers
English dance musicians
English expatriates in the United States
English fashion designers
English film actresses
English people of Irish descent
English people of Jewish descent
English pop rock singers
English television actresses
English television presenters
English voice actresses
English women singers
British LGBT rights activists
Kelly
Ozzy Osbourne
Participants in American reality television series
People with misophonia
People from Westminster
Project Catwalk
Singers from London
21st-century English actresses
21st-century English singers
21st-century English women singers